The 2014–16 European Nations Cup First Division is the premier rugby union competition below the Six Nations Championship in Europe. It is divided into two tiers; Division 1A and Division 1B.

The divisions play on a two-year cycle with the teams playing each other both home and away. From 2009 onward, the title is awarded according to a one-year ranking.

The competition has been slightly altered for the 2014–16 edition. The top tier Division 1A has seen the relegation of Belgium to Division 1B. They have been replaced with Germany, who finished at the top of Division 1B in the 2012–14 season. The bottom tier division 1B has seen the relegation of the Czech Republic to the European Nations Cup Second Division. They have been replaced by Netherlands who won promotion from Division 2A.

The champions of Division 1B will be promoted to Division 1A for the 2017–18 season, while the last placed team in each division will be relegated.

Format
Table points are determined as follows:
4 points for a win
2 points for a draw
0 point for a loss
1 bonus point for scoring 4 tries in a match
1 bonus point for losing by 7 points or fewer

Division 1A

2015

Table

Pre-tournament World Rugby Rankings in parentheses

Games

2016

Table

Games

Combined table (2015–2016)

Note: Portugal is relegated to 2016–17 Rugby Europe Trophy.

Division 1B

2014–15

Table

Pre-tournament IRB rankings in parentheses (as at 1 September 2014)

Games

2015–16

Table

Pre-tournament World Rugby rankings in parentheses (as at 1 September 2015)

Games

Combined table (2014–2016)

Pre-tournament IRB rankings in parentheses (as at 1 September 2014)

See also
European Nations Cup (rugby union)
FIRA - Association of European Rugby
Six Nations Championship
Antim Cup

References

External links
FIRA-AER official website

2014-16
2014–15 in European rugby union
2015–16 in European rugby union
2014 rugby union tournaments for national teams
2015 rugby union tournaments for national teams
2016 rugby union tournaments for national teams